Carlos Bustelo y García del Real (born 1936) served as the Spanish Minister of Industry from 1979 to 1980.

At the time Bustelo entered the cabinet, Spain was emerging from the Franco years and economic development had to contend with what Bustelo called, "the crushing mental inertia," inherited form the old regime.

Books

References

1936 births
Living people
Government ministers of Spain
Industry ministers of Spain